The Amordadegan festival, also transliterated as Amordadegan or Amardadegan, is an ancient Iranian tradition celebrated 127 days after Nowruz. Amordadegan in Persian means "without death". The 5th month of Persian calendar is Mordad that came from Amordad or Ameretat word. The Amordadegan festival was celebrated by the Zoroastrians over 4000 years. It falls on the 7th day of Mordad.

References

See also
 List of festivals in Iran

Festivals in Iran
Observances set by the Solar Hijri calendar
July observances
August observances
Persian festivals
Summer events in Iran